Geophis championi, the Panamenian earth snake,  is a species of snake in the family Colubridae. The species is endemic to Panama.

Etymology
The specific name, championi, is in honor of English entomologist George Charles Champion.

Habitat

Description
Dorsally, it is uniformly iridescent black. The ventrals and the subcaudals are whitish, edged with black.

Reproduction
G. championi is oviparous.

References

Further reading
Boulenger GA (1894). Catalogue of the Snakes in the British Museum (Natural History). Volume II., Containing the Conclusion of the Colubridæ Aglyphæ. London: Trustees of the British Museum (Natural History). (Taylor and Francis, printers). xi + 382 pp. + Plates I–XX. (Geophis championi, new species, pp. 321–322 + Plate XVI, figure 3, three views of head).
Downs FL (1967). "Intrageneric relations among colubrid snakes of the genus Geophis Wagler". Micellaneous Publications, Museum of Zoology, University of Michigan 131: 1–193.
Wilson LD, Townsend JH (2007). "A checklist and key to the snakes of the genus Geophis (Squamata: Colubridae: Dipsadinae), with commentary on distribution and conservation". Zootaxa 1395: 1–31.

Geophis
Snakes of Central America
Reptiles of Panama
Endemic fauna of Panama
Taxa named by George Albert Boulenger
Reptiles described in 1894